Badharghat is a census town in West Tripura district  in the state of Tripura, India.

Geography

Demographics
 India census, Badharghat had a population of 47,660. Males constitute 51% of the population and females 49%. Badharghat has an average literacy rate of 80%, higher than the national average of 59.5%; with 53% of the males and 47% of females literate. About 9% of the population is under 6 years of age.

Politics
Badharghat assembly constituency is part of Tripura West (Lok Sabha constituency).

References

Cities and towns in West Tripura district
West Tripura district